The Freddy Jones Band is a roots rock band from Chicago, Illinois. Band members have cited as their influences Duane Allman, Eric Clapton, Little Feat, Mark Knopfler, and Bob Dylan. Despite the band's name, none of the bandmembers is named Freddy Jones; according to a 1992 interview, guitarist Wayne Healy stated it was "inspired by a big fat comic strip character named Freddy."

History
The Chicago Tribune stated that the band was founded in 1990. Wayne Healy and Marty Lloyd, who grew up together, began playing with high school classmate Jim Bonaccorsi while all three attended Holy Cross College near South Bend, Indiana. According to Rolling Stone, Marty Lloyd and Wayne Healy were also college students at Loyola University in Chicago. Healy and Lloyd were the band's principal songwriters; by 1991, in addition to occasional songwriter Rob Bonaccorsi, the band had been filled out as a five-piece by the addition of Jim Bonaccorsi and Simon Horrocks. Their self-titled debut was released independently and then by Capricorn Records followed by Waiting for the Night (1993), North Avenue Wake Up Call (1995), and Lucid (1997). Their song "In A Daydream" peaked at #27 on the Mainstream Rock Chart in September 1994. In 1998, bassist Jim Bonaccorsi and guitar/vocalist Rob Bonaccorsi left the band and were replaced by bassist Mark Murphy. Due to tensions between founding members Marty Lloyd and Wayne Healy, the group splintered in the winter of 2000, after having recorded an album with producer David Baerwald that was never issued. Lloyd toured as the Marty Lloyd Band in 2000 with a group of musicians drawn from previous iterations of the Freddy Jones Band as well as members of Chicago group Sonia Dada. The original line up returned in 2005, doing shows in Chicago, Milwaukee and other Midwestern cities. After two live albums and a compilation album, their next studio album, Never Change, appeared in 2015.

Discography
 The Freddy Jones Band (Poor Boys, 1992; re-released with bonus material, 1994)
 Waiting for the Night (Capricorn, 1993)
 North Avenue Wake Up Call (Capricorn, 1995) US #186
 Lucid (PolyGram, 1997) 
 Mile High Live (Capricorn, 1999)
 High Spirits (Sony Special Products, 2006; compilation 1993–1995)
 Time Well Wasted (2009; live plus three new studio tracks)
 The Freddy Jones Band (Volcano, 2011) eight studio and three live tracks
 Never Change (Dustimmoff, 2015)

Band members

Current members

Marty Lloyd – lead vocals, guitar
 Rich Ross – bass, backing vocals

Former members
 Goose Lapoint;- Drums 
 Wayne Healy – vocals, guitar
 Jim Bonaccorsi – bass
 Rob Bonaccorsi – vocals, guitar
 Simon Horrocks – drums
 Jeff Duffy – drums
 Mark Murphy – bass
 Al Zorn – keyboards
 Scott Larned -keyboards
 John Sabey – bass
 Dale Robin Tulk – drums
 Ryan MacMillan – drums
 Robert S. Miller – drums
 Dave Preston – guitar
 Matthew Moon – guitar, lap steel, vocals
 Glen Kimberlin – bass, vocals
 Renn Anderson – guitar, vocals
 Jason Litwin - Percussion 
 Larry Beers - Drums

Notes and references

External links
Official Website

American blues rock musical groups
Musical groups from Chicago
Capricorn Records artists
Rock music groups from Illinois
Roots rock music groups
Holy Cross College (Indiana) alumni